Iron City is a town in Seminole County, Georgia, United States. The population was 310 at the 2010 census.

Geography

Iron City is located at  (31.014217, -84.812070).

According to the United States Census Bureau, the town has a total area of  consisting solely of land.

When Iron City was reincorporated in 1908, the corporate limits of the town were to be one half-mile in every direction of the Atlantic Coast Line Railroad Depot, according to the Ladies Club. On the map, Iron City is located at 31.01333 N Latitude and -84.81306 W Longitude. It is 40 miles east of Dothan, Alabama and 17 miles west of Bainbridge.

Demographics

As of the 2010 United States Census, there were 310 people living in the town. The racial makeup of the town was 84.5% White and 15.2% Black. 0.3% were Hispanic or Latino of any race.

As of the census of 2000, there were 321 people, 142 households, and 97 families living in the town. The racial makeup of the town was 77.88% White, 19.63% African American, 0.31% Asian, 1.25% from other races, and 0.93% from two or more races. Hispanic or Latino people of any race were 3.74% of the population.

There were 142 households, out of which 23.9% had children under the age of 18 living with them, 48.6% were married couples living together, 16.9% had a female householder with no husband present, and 31.0% were non-families. 28.9% of all households were made up of individuals, and 16.2% had someone living alone who was 65 years of age or older.  The average household size was 2.26 and the average family size was 2.74.

In the town, the population was spread out, with 23.7% under the age of 18, 6.9% from 18 to 24, 24.9% from 25 to 44, 23.7% from 45 to 64, and 20.9% who were 65 years of age or older.  The median age was 41 years. For every 100 females, there were 77.3 males.  For every 100 females age 18 and over, there were 75.0 males.

The median income for a household in the town was $25,781, and the median income for a family was $29,250. Males had a median income of $22,500 versus $21,786 for females. The per capita income for the town was $12,161.  About 12.9% of families and 23.4% of the population were below the poverty line, including 43.4% of those under age 18 and 17.1% of those age 65 or over.

History 

The original name of Iron City was Brooklyn. When the town was incorporated on December 20, 1900, its name was changed because much of the town's mail was sent to Brooklet, Georgia. According to the Seminole County Historical Society, it is believed that the name "Iron City" came about when a new well was being dug and hit a spot of iron ore. The citizens of Iron City thought that the discovery would bring great wealth to the people of the town.

The Alabama Midland Railroad was built near the town in 1889. A large two-story hotel housed the railroad crews.

Some of the first buildings on the site of Iron City were log cabins which sprang up around a saw mill, Southern Supply Company, and Joe Ausley's Turpentine Distillery. According to Chastine Burke, who moved to Iron City in 1930, Iron City had a cotton gin, Strickland Cotton Gin, around 1936.

The citizens of Iron City originally had to travel a few miles to the community of to Rock Pond to pick up their mail. According to the Iron City Ladies' Club, the first post office was established around 1889 in the back of a general merchandise store, with John L. Miller as the postmaster. Retired postmaster Sara Robinson stated that the new post office was built in 1962. In 1996, the town moved the post office to its present location on US Highway 84 and GA Highway 38.

According to the Ladies' Club, the first mayor was Ish Strickland, who was appointed by the governor. His aldermen were J.L. Dickerson, E.S. Perry, John Lane, and W.D. Archer.

Schools 

The first school in Iron City was a private school, held in a log cabin with dirt floors. Its first teacher was Linnie Keen Campbell Lane.

The second school was classified as a consolidated rural school. Bryan Collier taught grades one through ten. This school had a combination of a library and music room. An auditorium was added in 1915. The second school was destroyed by a fire on June 15, 1931.

A new school was built and ready for students by early fall of 1931. According to Chastine Burke, who attended the school, Speck Newberry was a teacher at the school. The new school housed only grades one through nine. "In 1963, Iron City School was closed and all students were sent to Donalsonville Elementary," stated Sara Robison.

Churches 

Iron City Baptist Church was one of the first churches in the city. The first meetings were held on the south side of town in 1896. The building was moved to its present location in 1904. In 1971, half an acre was donated to the church by John W. Bowen. All of the church property is estimated to now be worth $350,000.

The Iron City United Methodist Church was built in 1898 and it still stands as a historical landmark building. It was first organized in 1897 in the office of J.L. Dickenson. The land upon which the church was built was purchased from the Iron City Board of School Trustees.

There are six churches in Iron City: Iron City Baptist, Iron City United Methodist, Lighthouse Evangelical Mission, Macedonia Freewill Baptist, Cypress Pond Missionary Baptist, and Wesley Chapel African Methodist Episcopal.

Notes

References
Census Data. 14 Nov, 2007.
Seminole County Historical Society. Cornerstone of Georgia Seminole County. Georgia: W.H. Wolfe. 1991
Iron City Ladies' Club. Our Town Our Story. 2000
Robinson, Sara. Personal Interview. 10 Nov, 2007
Burke, Chastine. Personal Interview. 9 Nov, 2007

Towns in Seminole County, Georgia
Towns in Georgia (U.S. state)